Jean-Paul Gomez (born 8 May 1945) is a French long-distance runner. He competed in the men's 10,000 metres at the 1976 Summer Olympics.

References

1945 births
Living people
Athletes (track and field) at the 1976 Summer Olympics
French male long-distance runners
Olympic athletes of France
Athletes (track and field) at the 1979 Mediterranean Games
Sportspeople from Vienne
Mediterranean Games competitors for France
20th-century French people